Jasper is a city in Hamilton County, Florida, United States. The population was 4,546 at the 2010 census, up from 1,780 at the 2000 census. It is the county seat of Hamilton County. The Old Hamilton County Jail and the United Methodist Church in Jasper are on the National Register of Historic Places. One of the largest industries is phosphate mining.

Geography

The city is sits on a slightly higher elevated area surrounded by lowland.

U.S. Routes 41 and 129 run concurrently through the center of Jasper. US 41 continues northwest to Jennings and then into Georgia, and southeast to White Springs, while US 129 runs north to Statenville, Georgia and south to Live Oak.

Climate

History

Jasper is believed to rest on land originally thought to be the site of the Miccosukee (Mikasukis) people, a subtribe of the Seminole nation. The 1823 Treaty of Moultrie bought the Native American lands, and the population was required to move southeast of the Suwannee River. This allowed white settlers to move into the area. A suspected Native burial mound is located at Baisden Swamp (named after Josiah Baisden) just on the outskirts of Jasper. Six miles north of Jasper along the Alapaha River an established Native village called Halata-Micco (Hala-at-a-Mico) (named for Chief Billy Bowlegs of the Seminole, who may have resided there) once stood. Chief Bowlegs signed the Treaty of Paynes Landing (1832) at Hola-at-a-Mico, his "X" mark (aka Billy Bowlegs) establishing the type of Native inhabiting the area where artifacts of pottery, fishing spear points, and arrowheads are often found.

Soon after the Treaty of Moultrie in 1823 was delivered, Hamilton County was established as part of the original 15 counties in Florida. White settlers mostly from Georgia and South Carolina moved into the area in earnest between 1827 through the 1840s. In 1840 the inhabitants were calling the settlement "Pulaski"; others called it "Wall". Daniel Bell, living just outside the settlement in 1824, was county judge in 1828, appointed under the authority of the Acting Territorial Governor McCarty in Tallahassee. In 1839 he was a member of the Territorial Legislative Council. Legend has it that Mr. Bell, also considered to be the first settler of the county, disagreed with the names that were coming into use for places in the area. He met with locals (one of them named Simon Whitehurst, one of the few Revolutionary War veterans in Florida, buried in Jasper) and other friends, and decided to submit the name of "Jasper", in honor of Revolutionary War veteran William Jasper, to the territorial capitol in Tallahassee. There the name was registered and incorporated as documented in the Territorial Legislative Journal. In 1841 the Jasper Post Office was established, ending any discussion on names for the town. Florida became a state in 1845, and thirteen years later on March 2, 1858, the town's leaders incorporated the town of Jasper.

The early history and specific makeup of Jasper is rather vague except for scant records that survived several courthouse fires in the late 1800s. What we do know is that the original town was built about a mile south of its current location, near the site of the present day Hamilton Correctional Institution. The original courthouse and a stockade stood where Evergreen Cemetery is located. The citizens fought Seminole raiding parties throughout the early periods, the last Seminole War ending in 1858. In 1861 the Civil War came to Jasper. The Jasper Blues ("I" Company 2nd Infantry CSA) was created from Jasper and county citizens. The unit rendezvoused west of Jacksonville and were shipped by train to Virginia, arriving on the day of the First Battle of Manassas. They were eventually made a part of the First Corps (Stonewall Jackson's) of the Army of Northern Virginia led by General Robert E. Lee. A school in Jasper was named in Lee's honor and is occupied today by the County School Board Offices.

In 1865 the Savannah, Florida, and Western railway was completed, and a depot was built about a mile north of the town center. Businesses and homes migrated toward the railroad, and eventually the current town was established along that line. The town grew in earnest between 1890 and 1930 with a rich trade in turpentine, tobacco, cotton, and pine lumber. Jasper reached its pinnacle in the 1920s with a booming population of over 2,000. Most of Jasper's present buildings were built during this 40-year period.

Since the 1920s Jasper has seen many economic changes. The leading cotton industry gave way to the turpentine industry, turpentine to lumber, lumber to tobacco, and finally tobacco to phosphate mining. The completion of Interstate 75 in the late 1950s caused further decline as tourists and shipping bypassed the town. In 2002 town officials extended the city limits and infrastructure to the intersection of US 129 and Interstate 75, and built infrastructure (water and sewer) with the help of county officials to the Hamilton County Industrial Park along US 41 in order to encourage economic growth and development. Since that time several new businesses have moved into the area, and the new high school has been built along the route.

The large jump in population between 2000 (1,780) and 2010 (4,546) was due to the incorporation of land containing the Hamilton County Correctional Facility into the city limits.

The first settlement in Hamilton County was called Micco Town or more accurately Hala-at-aha Micco which is interpreted as "Chief of the Miccosukee"; therefore, it is strongly believed to have been the home of Chief Billy Bowlegs who signed the Treaty of Moultrie, 1823.

Demographics

2020 census

As of the 2020 United States census, there were 3,621 people, 703 households, and 450 families residing in the city.

2000 census

As of the census of 2000, there were 1,780 people, 742 households, and 488 families residing in the city. The racial makeup of the city was 52.25% White, 45.67% African American, 0.06% Native American, 0.28% Asian, 0.73% from other races, and 1.01% from two or more races. Hispanic or Latino of any race were 3.09% of the population.

There were 742 households, out of which 28.4% had children under the age of 18 living with them, 37.7% were married couples living together, 23.5% had a female householder with no husband present, and 34.2% were non-families. 31.5% of all households were made up of individuals, and 15.0% had someone living alone who was 65 years of age or older.  The average household size was 2.40 and the average family size was 3.01.

In the city, the population was spread out, with 29.3% under the age of 18, 8.3% from 18 to 24, 23.3% from 25 to 44, 22.5% from 45 to 64, and 16.6% who were 65 years of age or older.  The median age was 35 years. For every 100 females, there were 74.3 males.  For every 100 females age 18 and over, there were 69.5 males.

The median income for a household in the city was $19,018, and the median income for a family was $23,664. Males had a median income of $30,938 versus $17,244 for females. The per capita income for the city was $12,844.  About 30.5% of families and 37.4% of the population were below the poverty line, including 56.5% of those under age 18 and 18.7% of those age 65 or over.

Education

The Hamilton County School District operates the public schools serving Jasper, Hamilton County Elementary School and Hamilton County High School, both in an unincorporated area of the county.

Central Hamilton Elementary School in Jasper previously served the city. It was consolidated into a new elementary school, Hamilton County Elementary School, located in an unincorporated area south of Jasper. Its opening is scheduled for August 2017.

The Suwannee River Regional Library System operates the Jasper Public Library (Virginia B. Chandler Public Library) in Jasper.

Notable people

 Alex J. Brown, former football player for the Chicago Bears and New Orleans Saints
 Don Bryant, former Major League Baseball player and bullpen coach
 Marquis Daniels, NBA guard/forward for the Milwaukee Bucks
 Art Smith, chef of Southern cuisine, frequent guest on The Today Show
 Lillian Smith, author of the 1944 best-seller Strange Fruit, born in Jasper before moving with her family to Clayton, Georgia at age 17 after graduating from high school

Local publications

  Jasper News] – local newspaper for Jasper

References

External links

 City of Jasper
 Zoning map

County seats in Florida
Cities in Hamilton County, Florida
Cities in Florida